Cenan Akın (1932, Şebinkarahisar – 3 November 2006, Istanbul) was a Turkish composer, conductor and music educator. He directed the first L.P. disc of modern Turkish choral music in the mid-1960s.

Works
 Op. 1 İlk Şarkılar First Songs (voice and piano) 
 Op. 2 Çocuk Bahçesi Children's Playground (voice and piano) 
 Op. 3 Altı Şarkı Six Songs (piano)
 Op. 4 Küçüklerin Dünyası Minors World (piano)
 Op. 5 Halk Türküleri Folk Songs (for choir)
 Op. 6 Rubailer (bass and piano)
 Op. 7 Sokaktayım In the street (bass and piano)
 Op. 8 On Çocuk Şarkısı On Children's Song
 Op. 9 Sinan'm Sarkılan (songs) 
 Op. 10 Yunus' tan Deyişler Sayings of Yunus (solo-chorus and orchestra)
 Op. 11 Kirtim Kirt (for male chorus)
 Op. 12 Uzun Hava ve Horon Long-Air and Online (piano)
 Op. 13 Orkestra İçin Üç Türkü (Bölümler: Dumanlı Boğaz; Ağıt; Yiğitleme) - Three Turks (3 Parts: Misty throat; Requiem; Yiğitleme)
 Op. 14 Marşlar Anthems (voice and piano)
 Op. 15 Dağlar-Karakoyun Karakoyun Mountains (piano)
 Op. 16 Duyuş Feeling (for piano)
 Destan (for orchestra)
 Can Yurdum (for mixed choir)
 On Bir Mani (for mixed choir)
 Yayîa'da (for flute solo)

References

Turkish composers
1947 births
2006 deaths